Avellanosa de Muñó is a municipality and town located in the province of Burgos, Castile and León, Spain. According to the 2013 census (INE), the municipality has a population of 122 inhabitants.

The municipality of Avellanosa de Muñó is made up of four towns: Avellanosa de Muñó (seat or capital), Paúles del Agua, Pinedillo and Torrecitores del Enebral.

References 

Municipalities in the Province of Burgos